Delturus brevis is a species of armored catfish endemic to the Rio Jequitinhonha basin in eastern Brazil.

References

Loricariidae
Catfish of South America
Fish of Brazil
Endemic fauna of Brazil
Taxa named by Roberto Esser dos Reis
Fish described in 2006